Kirchweidach (Central Bavarian: Kiaweidá) is a municipality in the district of Altötting in Bavaria in Germany. It is known for its high level of barn owls and is frequently visited by barn owl enthusiasts in search of their favourite birds.

References

Altötting (district)